Myriopteris intertexta, formerly Cheilanthes intertexta, is a species of lip fern known by the common name coastal lip fern. It is native to montane California and western Nevada, Oregon east of the Cascades, and with a disjunct population in central Utah. It grows in dry rocky habitats in sun, typically in rock cracks with little or no soil.

Description
This fern produces clusters of dark green leaves up to about 25 centimeters long. Each leaf is divided into bumpy segments which are subdivided into pairs of rounded beadlike ultimate segments with their edges curled under to make them concave underneath. Each ultimate segment is less than 3 millimeters wide, sparsely hairy on top and scaly on the underside. Its sori are mostly hidden under the scales and curled leaflet margin (false indusium). The long-lanceolate scales on the underside of the leaflets are approximately 1 mm wide at their base, intermediate between those of its two parents (M. gracillima scales are very narrow (hair like) and those of M. covillei are 2–3 mm wide). The leaves arise from a short creeping rhizome, such that plants often have an elongated base, for example creeping along a rock crevice.

Range
The range of M. intertexta is intermediate between that of its two parents M. gracillima (with a range that extends further north) and M. covillei (with a range that extends further south and east into southern California, Arizona, and the Baja California peninsula and central Mexico).

Taxonomy
This fern is thought to be an allotetraploid fertile hybrid of Myriopteris gracillima (maternal) and Myriopteris covillei (paternal).

References

Works cited

External links
 Calflora Database: Myriopteris intertexta (Coastal lip fern) — formerly Cheilanthes intertexta.
Jepson Manual eFlora (TJM2) treatment of Myriopteris intertexta — formerly Cheilanthes intertexta.
USDA Plants Profile for Cheilanthes intertexta (coastal lip fern)
UC Photos gallery — Cheilanthes intertexta

intertexta
Ferns of California
Ferns of the United States
Flora of Nevada
Flora of Oregon
Flora of the Sierra Nevada (United States)
Natural history of the California Coast Ranges
Natural history of the Transverse Ranges